Westphalia Independent School District is a public school district based in the unincorporated community of Westphalia, Texas (USA).

The district has one school that serves students in grades kindergarten through eight. The school mascot is the Bluejay.

In 2009, the school district was rated "exemplary" by the Texas Education Agency.

Schools
Westphalia Elementary School (Grades K-5)
Westphalia Middle School (Grades 6-8)

Athletics
Westphalia Middle School takes part in a variety of sports:

Boys
Football, Cross country running, Basketball, and Track

Girls
Volleyball, Cheerleading, Cross Country, Basketball, and Track.

References

External links
Westphalia ISD

School districts in Falls County, Texas